In graph theory, a matching in a hypergraph is a set of hyperedges, in which every two hyperedges are disjoint. It is an extension of the notion of matching in a graph.

Definition 
Each hyperedge may contain one or more vertices.

Let  be a 3-uniform hypergraph with 4 hyperedges:

 

Then  admits several matchings of size 2, for example:

 
 
However, in any subset of 3 hyperedges, at least two of them intersect, so there is no matching of size 3.

Intersecting hypergraph 
A hypergraph  is called intersecting if every two hyperedges in  have a vertex in common. A hypergraph  is intersecting if and only if it has no matching with two or more hyperedges, if and only if .

Matching in a graph as a special case 
A graph without self-loops is just a 2-uniform hypergraph: each edge can be considered as a set of the two vertices that it connects. For example, this 2-uniform hypergraph represents a graph with 4 vertices  and 3 edges:

 
By the above definition, a matching in a graph is a set  of edges, such that each two edges in  have an empty intersection.

Fractional matching 
A matching is a special case of a fractional matching in which all fractions are either 0 or 1. The size of a fractional matching is the sum of fractions of all hyperedges.

Since a matching is a special case of a fractional matching, for every hypergraph : Matching-number()   ≤   fractional-matching-number()
Symbolically, this principle is written:

In general, the fractional matching number may be larger than the matching number.  A theorem by Zoltán Füredi provides upper bounds on the fractional-matching-number() ratio:

 If each hyperedge in  contains at most  vertices, then In particular, in a simple graph:
 The inequality is sharp: Let  be the -uniform finite projective plane. Therefore the ratio is exactly .
 If  is such that the -uniform finite projective plane does not exist (for example), then a stronger inequality holds: 
 If  is -partite (the vertices are partitioned into  parts and each hyperedge contains a vertex from each part), then:In particular, in a bipartite graph, . This was proved by András Gyárfás. 
 The inequality is sharp: Let  be the truncated projective plane of order .

Perfect matching 
This is the natural extension of the notion of perfect matching in a graph.

Consider a hypergraph  in which each hyperedge contains at most  vertices. If  admits a perfect fractional matching, then its fractional matching number is at least . If each hyperedge in  contains exactly  vertices, then its fractional matching number is at exactly .

For example, if  and  then  is balanced, with the perfect fractional matching 

There are various sufficient conditions for the existence of a perfect matching in a hypergraph:

 Hall-type theorems for hypergraphs - presents sufficient conditions analogous to Hall's marriage theorem, based on sets of neighbors. 
 Perfect matching in high-degree hypergraphs - presents sufficient conditions analogous to Dirac's theorem on Hamiltonian cycles, based on degree of vertices. 
 Keevash and Mycroft developed a geometric theory for hypergraph matching.

Balanced set-family 
A set-family  over a ground set  is called balanced (with respect to ) if the hypergraph  admits a perfect fractional matching. 

For example, consider the vertex set  and the edge set   is balanced, since there is a perfect fractional matching with weights

Computing a maximum matching 
The problem of finding a maximum-cardinality matching in a hypergraph, thus calculating , is NP-hard even for 3-uniform hypergraphs (see 3-dimensional matching). This is in contrast to the case of simple (2-uniform) graphs in which computing a maximum-cardinality matching can be done in polynomial time.

Matching and covering 
It is a generalization of the notion of a vertex cover in a graph.

A vertex cover is a special case of a fractional vertex cover in which all weights are either 0 or 1. The size of a fractional vertex-cover is the sum of fractions of all vertices.

Since a vertex-cover is a special case of a fractional vertex-cover, for every hypergraph :
fractional-vertex-cover-number  ≤   vertex-cover-number. 
Linear programming duality implies that, for every hypergraph :
fractional-matching-number  =  fractional-vertex-cover-number(). 
Hence, for every hypergraph :

Therefore:

This inequality is tight: equality holds, for example, when   contains   vertices and  contains all subsets of  vertices.

However, in general , since ; see Fractional matching above.

Ryser's conjecture says that, in every -partite -uniform hypergraph:

Some special cases of the conjecture have been proved; see Ryser's conjecture.

Kőnig's property 
A hypergraph has the Kőnig property if its maximum matching number equals its minimum vertex-cover number, namely if . The Kőnig-Egerváry theorem shows that every bipartite graph has the Kőnig property. To extend this theorem to hypergraphs, we need to extend the notion of bipartiteness to hypergraphs.

A natural generalization is as follows. A hypergraph is called 2-colorable if its vertices can be 2-colored so that every hyperedge (of size at least 2) contains at least one vertex of each color. An alternative term is Property B. A simple graph is bipartite iff it is 2-colorable. However, there are 2-colorable hypergraphs without Kőnig's property. However, its matching number is 1 and its vertex-cover number is 2.

A stronger generalization is as follows. A hypergraph is called balanced if all its restrictions are 2-colorable. A simple graph is bipartite iff it is balanced.

A simple graph is bipartite iff it has no odd-length cycles. Similarly, a hypergraph is balanced iff it has no odd-length circuits. The circuit is called unbalanced if each hyperedge contains no other vertices in the circuit. Claude Berge proved that a hypergraph is balanced if and only if it does not contain an unbalanced odd-length circuit. Every balanced hypergraph has Kőnig's property.

The following are equivalent:

 Every partial hypergraph of  has the property that its maximum degree equals its minimum edge coloring number.

Matching and packing 
The problem of set packing is equivalent to hypergraph matching.

The problem of finding a maximum vertex-packing in a graph is equivalent to the problem of finding a maximum matching in a hypergraph:

But it has some theoretical uses.

See also 
 3-dimensional matching – a special case of hypergraph matching to 3-uniform hypergraphs.
 Vertex cover in hypergraphs
 Bipartite hypergraph
 Rainbow matching in hypergraphs
 D-interval hypergraph - an infinite hypergraph in which there is some relation between the matching and the covering number.
 Erdős–Ko–Rado theorem on pairwise non-disjoint edges in hypergraphs

References 

Hypergraphs
Matching (graph theory)